Ray Murphy may refer to:

 Ray Murphy (footballer) (born 1935), Australian rules footballer
 Ray Murphy (coach), American football coach
 Ray Murphy Jr. (1946–2010), American collegiate wrestler
 Ray Murphy (Neighbours), fictional character on Australian soap opera Neighbours